Prabhat  Patnaik is an Indian Marxist economist and political commentator. He taught at the Centre for Economic Studies and Planning in the School of Social Sciences at Jawaharlal Nehru University in New Delhi, from 1974 until his retirement in 2010. He was the vice-chairman of Kerala State Planning Board from June 2006 to May 2011.

Early life and education
Patnaik was born on 19 September 1945 in Jatni, Odisha. His father was the communist leader and Member of the Legislative Assembly (MLA), Prananath Patnaik. Prabhat, after his early schooling in his hometown, studied at the Daly College, Indore on a Government of India Merit Scholarship. He passed his B.A. with Economics Honours from the St. Stephen's College, Delhi, ranking first in the first class. Afterwards, He went to University of Oxford in 1966 on a Rhodes Scholarship and studied at Balliol College and later at Nuffield College. He obtained his Bachelor of Philosophy and his Doctor of Philosophy degrees from Oxford.

Career
Patnaik joined the Faculty of Economics and Politics of the University of Cambridge, UK in 1969 and was elected a fellow of Clare College, Cambridge. In 1974 he returned to India as an associate professor at the newly established Centre for Economic Studies and Planning (CESP) at the Jawaharlal Nehru University (JNU), New Delhi. He became a professor at the Centre in 1983 and taught there till his retirement in 2010. At the time of retirement, he held the Sukhamoy Chakravarty Chair in Planning and Development at CESP.

His specialization is macroeconomics and political economy, areas in which he has written a number of books and articles. Some of his books includes Time, Inflation and Growth (1988), Economics and Egalitarianism (1990), Whatever Happened to Imperialism and Other Essays (1995), Accumulation and Stability Under Capitalism (1997), The Retreat to Unfreedom (2003), The Value of Money (2008) and Re-envisioning Socialism (2011). He is the editor of the journal Social Scientist.

He is married to a Marxist economist Professor Utsa Patnaik. He served as the vice-chairman of the Kerala State Planning Board from June 2006 to May 2011. He was part of a four-member high-power task force of the United Nations (U.N.) to recommend reform measures for the global financial system. Chaired by Joseph Stiglitz, the other members were Belgian sociologist Francois Houtart and Ecuador's Minister for Economic Policy Pedro Paez.

Views
Prabhat Patnaik is a staunch critic of both neoliberal economic policies and Hindutva, and is known as a social scientist of Marxist–Leninist persuasion. According to him, in India, the increase in economic growth has been accompanied by an increase in the magnitude of absolute poverty. The only solution is to alter the class orientation of the Indian State.

Honours, awards and international recognition
In 2012, Prabhat was awarded honorary Doctor of Science in Economics from School of Oriental and African Studies at University of London. He also delivered the prestigious Prof. Baidyanath Misra Endowment Lecture of the Orissa Economics Association, in 2012.He has been selected for the 2022 Malcom Adiseshiah Award for his contributions to development studies for an outstanding economist.

Books, research papers and journals

Books
 Accumulation and Stability under Capitalism (1997) (Publisher: Oxford University Press)
 A Theory of Imperialism (2016) (Publisher: Columbia University Press)
 The Value of Money (2008) (Publisher: Columbia University Press)
 Marx's Capital: An Introductory Reader Essays (2011) (Publisher: Leftword Books)
 Lenin and Imperialism: An Appraisal of Theories and Contemporary Reality (1986) (Publisher: Stosius Inc/Advent Books Division)
 Re-Envisioning Socialism (2011) (Publisher: Tulika Books)
 Excursus in History: Essays on Some Ideas of Irfan Habib (Modern Indian Thinkers) (2011) (Publisher: Tulika Books)
 Economics and Egalitarianism (1991) (Publisher: Oxford University Press)
 Accumulation and Stability under Capitalism (1997) (Publisher: Clarendon Press)
 Retreat to Unfreedom: Essays on the Emerging World Order (2003) (Publisher: Tulika Publishers)

Others
 Economic Challenges for the Contemporary World: Essays in Honour of Prabhat Patnaik (2016) (Publisher: SAGE Publications Pvt. Ltd)

References

External links

 Home page at JNU
 Audio of Prabhat Patnaik on "The State under neo-liberalism" 30 October 2006
 Video of Joseph Stiglitz and Prabhat Patnaik discussing "An Emergent India: Prospects and Problems" 13 Feb 2007
 Audio of Prabhat Patnaik's lecture on "The Global Economic Crisis" 2 December 2008

1945 births
Living people
Alumni of Balliol College, Oxford
Alumni of Nuffield College, Oxford
Alumni of the University of Oxford
20th-century Indian economists
Indian Marxists
Marxian economists
St. Stephen's College, Delhi alumni
Fellows of Clare College, Cambridge
Academics of the University of Cambridge
Academic staff of Jawaharlal Nehru University
Indian Rhodes Scholars
Indian Marxist writers
Indian political writers
Indian male writers
Scientists from Odisha
People from Khordha district
21st-century Indian economists
21st-century Indian non-fiction writers
20th-century Indian non-fiction writers
Writers from Odisha
The Daly College Alumni